The 2023 SAFF Club Championship is the proposed inaugural edition of the SAFF Club Championship, an international football competition between domestic champion clubs sides affiliated with the member associations of the South Asian Football Federation (SAFF).

Qualified teams

Venues
The venues of the tournament are yet to be confirmed.

Draw

References

International association football competitions in Asia